Gözkaya, historically Külgüman, is a village in the Kilis District, Kilis Province, Turkey. The village is inhabited by Kurds of Delikan tribe and had a population of 352 in 2022.

In late 19th century, German orientalist Martin Hartmann listed Külgüman as a settlement with 10 houses.

References

Villages in Kilis District
Kurdish settlements in Kilis Province